The foreign relations of Iran are the economic and diplomatic relationships between the Iranian government and governments of other countries. Geography is a very significant factor in informing Iran's foreign policy. Following the 1979 Iranian Revolution, the newly formed Islamic Republic, under the leadership of Ayatollah Khomeini, dramatically reversed the pro-American foreign policy of the last Shah of Iran Mohammad Reza Pahlavi. Since then the country's policies have oscillated between the two opposing tendencies of revolutionary ardour to eliminate Western and non-Muslim influences while promoting the Islamic revolution abroad, and pragmatism, which would advance economic development and normalization of relations. Iran's bilateral dealings are accordingly sometimes confused and contradictory.

Iran currently maintains diplomatic relations with 97 countries. According to data published by the Reputation Institute, Iran is the world's second least internationally reputable country, just ahead of Iraq, and has held that position for the three consecutive years of 2016, 2017, and 2018. Islamism and nuclear proliferation are recurring issues with Iran's foreign relations. In a series of international polls by Pew Research in 2012, only one country (Pakistan) had the majority of its population supporting Iran's right to acquire nuclear arms; every other population polled overwhelmingly rejected a nuclear-armed Iran (90–95% opposed in the polled European, North American, and South American countries), and majorities in most of them were in favor of military action to prevent a nuclear-armed Iran from materializing. Additionally, the majority of Americans, Brazilians, Japanese, Mexicans, Egyptians, Germans, Brits, French, Italians, Spaniards, and Poles (among other national groups) had majority support for "tougher sanctions" on Iran, while majorities in China, Russia, and Turkey opposed tougher sanctions.

Background
Iranians have traditionally been highly sensitive to foreign interference in their country, pointing to such events as the Russian conquest of northern parts of the country in the course of the 19th century, the tobacco concession, the British and Russian occupations of the First and Second World Wars, and the CIA plot to overthrow Prime Minister Mohammed Mosaddeq. This suspicion manifests itself in attitudes that many foreigners might find incomprehensible, such as the "fairly common" belief that the Iranian Revolution was actually the work of a conspiracy between Iran's Shi'a clergy and the British government. This may have been a result of the anti-Shah bias in BBC Radio's influential Persian broadcasts into Iran: a BBC report of 23 March 2009 explains that many in Iran saw the broadcaster and the government as one, and interpreted the bias for Khomeini as evidence of weakening British government support for the Shah. It is entirely plausible that the BBC did indeed help hasten revolutionary events.

Revolutionary period under Khomeini

Under the Khomeini government Iran's foreign policy often emphasized the elimination of foreign influence and the spread of Islamic revolution over state-to-state relations or the furtherance of trade. In Khomeini's own words:

We shall export our revolution to the whole world. Until the cry "There is no God but Allah" resounds over the whole world, there will be struggle.

The Islamic Republic's effort to spread the revolution is considered to have begun in earnest in March 1982, when 380 men from more than 25 Arab and Islamic nations met at the former Tehran Hilton Hotel for a "seminar" on the "ideal Islamic government" and, less academically, the launch of a large-scale offensive to cleanse the Islamic world of the satanic Western and Communist influences that were seen to be hindering the Islamic world's progress. The gathering of militants, primarily Shi'a but including some Sunnis, "with various religious and revolutionary credentials," was hosted by the Association of Militant Clerics and the Pasdaran Islamic Revolutionary Guards. The nerve centre of the revolutionary crusade, operational since shortly after the 1979 revolution, was located in downtown Tehran and known to outsiders as the "Taleghani Centre". Here the groundwork for the gathering was prepared: the establishment of Arab cadres, recruited or imported from surrounding countries to spread the revolution, and provision of headquarters for such groups as the Islamic Front for the Liberation of Bahrain, the Iraqi Shi'a movement, and Philippine Moro, Kuwaiti, Saudi, North African and Lebanese militant clerics.

These groups came under the umbrella of the "Council for the Islamic Revolution", which was supervised by Ayatollah Hussein Ali Montazeri, the designated heir of Ayatollah Khomeini. Most of the council's members were clerics, but they also reportedly included advisors from the Syrian and Libyan intelligence agencies. The council apparently received more than $1 billion annually in contributions from the faithful in other countries and in funds allocated by the Iranian government.

Its strategy was two-pronged: armed struggle against what were perceived as Western imperialism and its agents; and an internal purifying process to free Islamic territory and Muslim minds of non-Islamic cultural, intellectual and spiritual influences, by providing justice, services, resources to the mustazafin (weak) masses of the Muslim world. These attempts to spread its Islamic revolution strained the country's relations with many of its Arab neighbours, and the extrajudicial execution of Iranian dissidents in Europe unnerved European nations, particularly France and Germany. For example, the Islamic Republic expressed its opinion of Egypt's secular government by naming a street in Tehran after Egyptian President Anwar Sadat's killer, Khalid al-Istanbuli. At this time Iran found itself very isolated, but this was a secondary consideration to the spread of revolutionary ideals across the Persian Gulf and confrontation with the US (or "Great Satan") in the 1979-1981 hostage crisis.

Training volunteers
Arab and other Muslim volunteers who came to Iran were trained in camps run by the Revolutionary Guards. There were three primary bases in Tehran, and others in Ahvaz, Isfahan, Qom, Shiraz, and Mashhad, and a further facility, converted in 1984, near the southern naval base at Bushire.

In 1981 Iran supported an attempt to overthrow the Bahraini government, in 1983 expressed political support for Shi'ites who bombed Western embassies in Kuwait, and in 1987 Iranian pilgrims rioted at poor living conditions and treatment during the Hajj (pilgrimage) in Mecca, Saudi Arabia, and were consequently massacred. Nations with strong fundamentalist movements, such as Egypt and Algeria, also began to mistrust Iran. With the Israeli invasion of Lebanon, Iran was thought to be supporting the creation of the Hizballah organization. Furthermore, Iran went on to oppose the Arab–Israeli peace process, because it saw Israel as an illegal country.

Iran–Iraq War 

Relations with Iraq had never been good historically; however, they took a turn for the worse in 1980, when Iraq invaded Iran. The stated reason for Iraq's invasion was the contested sovereignty over the Shatt al-Arab waterway (Arvand Rud in Persian). Other reasons, unstated, were probably more significant: Iran and Iraq had a history of interference in each other's affairs by supporting separatist movements, and although this interference had ceased since the Algiers Agreement (1975), after the Revolution Iran resumed support for Kurdish guerrillas in Iraq.

Iran demanded the withdrawal of Iraqi troops from Iranian territory and the return to the status quo ante for the Shatt al-Arab, as established under the Algiers Agreement. This period saw Iran become even more isolated, with virtually no allies. Exhausted by the war, Iran signed UN Security Council Resolution 598 in July 1988, after the United States and Germany began supplying Iraq with chemical weapons. The ceasefire resulting from the UN resolution was implemented on 20 August 1988. Neither nation had made any real gains in the war, which left one million dead and had a dramatic effect on the country's foreign policy. From this point on, the Islamic Republic recognized that it had no choice but to moderate its radical approach and rationalize its objectives. This was the beginning of what Anoushiravan Ehteshami calls the "reorientation phase" of Iranian foreign policy.

Pragmatism
Like other revolutionary states, practical considerations have sometimes led the Islamic Republic to inconsistency and subordination of such ideological concerns as pan-Islamic solidarity. One observer, Graham Fuller, has called the Islamic Republic "stunningly silent"
about [Muslim] Chechens in [non-Muslim] Russia, or Uyghurs in China, simply because the Iranian state has important strategic ties with both China and Russia that need to be preserved in the state interest. Iran has astonishingly even supported Christian Armenia in the First Nagorno-Karabakh War against Shi'ite Azerbaijan and has been careful not to lend too much support to Islamic Tajiks in Tajikistan, where the language is basically a dialect of Persian. In this regard the Islamic Republic resembles another revolutionary state, the old Soviet Union. The USSR was ideologically committed not to Islam but to world proletarian revolution, led by Communist parties under its leadership, but "frequently abandoned support to foreign communist parties when it served Soviet national interests to cooperate with the governments that were oppressing them."

Post-War period (1988–present)

Since the end of the Iran–Iraq War, Iran's new foreign policy has had a dramatic effect on its global standing. Relations with the European Union have dramatically improved, to the point where Iran is a major oil exporter and a trading partner with such countries as Italy, France, and Germany. China and India have also emerged as friends of Iran; these three countries face similar challenges in the global economy as they industrialize, and consequently find themselves aligned on a number of issues.

Iran maintains regular diplomatic and commercial relations with Russia and the former Soviet Republics. Both Iran and Russia believe they have important national interests at stake in developments in Central Asia and the Transcaucasus, particularly concerning energy resources from the Caspian Sea.

Significant historical treaties
 Treaty of Zuhab by which Iran irrevocably lost Mesopotamia (Iraq) to the Ottomans. Roughly settled the modern-day Iran-Iraq-Turkey borders
 Treaty of Gulistan 1813, by which Iran irrevocably lost Georgia, Dagestan, and most of Azerbaijan.
 Treaty of Turkmenchay 1828, by which Iran irrevocably lost Armenia and the remainder of the contemporary Republic of Azerbaijan (comprising the Lankaran and Nakchivan khanates.
 Treaty of Akhal
 Treaty of Paris (1857) (by which Iran renounced claims over Herat and parts of Afghanistan)
 Anglo-Russian Convention of 1907

Current policies

The Islamic Republic of Iran accords priority to its relations with the other states in the region and with the rest of the Islamic world. This includes a strong commitment to the Organisation of Islamic Cooperation (OIC) and the Non-Aligned Movement. Relations with the states of the Arab Gulf Cooperation Council (GCC), especially with Saudi Arabia, are characterized by rivalry and hostility. An unresolved territorial dispute with the United Arab Emirates concerning three islands in the Persian Gulf continues to mar its relations with these states. Iran has close relations with Kuwait.

Iran seeks new allies around the world due to its increasing political and economic isolation in the international community. This isolation is evident in the various economic sanctions and the EU oil embargo that have been implemented in response to questions that have been raised over the Iranian nuclear program.

Tehran supports the Interim Governing Council in Iraq, but it strongly advocates a prompt and full transfer of state authority to the Iraqi people. Iran hopes for stabilization in Afghanistan and supports the reconstruction effort so that the Afghan refugees in Iran (which number approximately 2.5 million.) can return to their homeland and the flow of drugs from Afghanistan can be stemmed. Iran is also pursuing a policy of stabilization and cooperation with the countries of the Caucasus and Central Asia, whereby it is seeking to capitalise on its central location to establish itself as the political and economic hub of the region.

On the international scene, it has been argued by some that Iran has become, or will become in the near future, a superpower due to its ability to influence international events. Others, such as Robert Baer, have argued that Iran is already an energy superpower and is on its way to becoming an empire. Flynt Leverett calls Iran a rising power that might well become a nuclear power in coming years—if the US does not prevent Iran from acquiring nuclear technology, as part of a grand bargain under which Iran would cease its nuclear activities in exchange for a guarantee of its borders by the US.

Current territorial disputes

 Iran and Iraq restored diplomatic relations in 1990, but they are still trying to work out written agreements settling outstanding disputes from their eight-year war concerning border demarcation, prisoners of war, and freedom of navigation in and sovereignty over the Shatt al-Arab waterway.
 Iran governs and possesses two islands in the Persian Gulf claimed by the UAE: Lesser Tunb (which the UAE calls Tunb as Sughra in Arabic, and Iran calls Jazireh-ye Tonb-e Kuchek in Persian) and Greater Tunb (Arabic Tunb al Kubra, Persian Jazireh-ye Tonb-e Bozorg).
 Iran jointly administers with the UAE an island in the Persian Gulf claimed by the UAE (Arabic Abu Musa, Persian, Jazireh-ye Abu Musa), over which Iran has taken steps to exert unilateral control since 1992, including access restrictions.
 The Caspian Sea borders between Azerbaijan, Iran, and Turkmenistan are not yet determined, although this problem is set to be resolved peacefully in the coming years through slow negotiations. After the breakup of the USSR, the newly independent republics bordering the Caspian Sea claimed shares of territorial waters and the seabed, thus unilaterally abrogating the existing half-and-half USSR-Iran agreements which, like all other Soviet treaties, the republics had agreed to respect upon their independence. It has been suggested by these countries that the Caspian Sea should be divided in proportion to each bordering country's shoreline, in which case Iran's share would be reduced to about 13%. The Iranian side has expressed eagerness to know if this means that all Irano–Russian and –Soviet agreements are void, entitling Iran to claim territorial sovereignty over lands lost to Russia by treaties that the parties still consider vivant. Issues between Russia, Kazakhstan, and Azerbaijan were settled in 2003, but Iran does not recognize these agreements, on the premise that the international law governing open water can not be applied to the Caspian Sea, which is in fact a lake (a landlocked body of water). Iran has not pressed its Caspian territorial claims in recent years because it relies heavily on Russia's support in its nuclear-development battle with the West.

Foreign policy strategies 
 Exporting the Islamic Revolution
 Theory of Umm al-Qura
 Pattern-making of the Islamic Republic
 De-escalation
 Dialogue Among Civilizations
 Look to the East

Ministry of Foreign Affairs
The Minister of Foreign Affairs of Iran is selected by the President of Iran.

Foreign relations by country

Africa
In 2010, Foreign Minister Manouchehr Mottaki said it was a principle of the government to boost ties with African states. However, there are some signs of disillusionment beginning to emerge in Africa in that twenty African nations threatened to close their embassies in Tehran following what they termed Ahmadinejad's failure to live up to the promises he made during his trips to Africa. However, the Iranian government does not seem deterred by the misadventures, and seems to keep considering African countries strategically necessary to enable it to receive international support for its much criticized nuclear program.

Americas
Trade between Iran and Brazil quadrupled between 2002 and 2007, and it will further increase as much as fivefold, from $2 billion to $10 billion annually. In addition to Brazil, Iran has signed dozens of economic agreements with Bolivia, Cuba, Ecuador and Nicaragua. In Nicaragua, Iran and Venezuela have agreed to invest $350 million in building a deepwater seaport off the Caribbean coast, in addition to a cross-country system of pipelines, rails and highways. Iranian firms are also planning to build two cement factories in Bolivia. Other developments include the agreement reached with Ecuador to build a cement factory as well as several other industrial cooperation MoUs (2008). In the four years after Ahmadinejad ascended to the Iranian presidency in 2005, Iran opened six new embassies in Latin America.  The new embassies are located in Bolivia, Chile, Colombia, Ecuador, Nicaragua and Uruguay - in addition to the five already in operation in Argentina, Brazil, Cuba, Mexico and Venezuela.

Asia

Europe

Oceania

International organization participation
Iran is the member of the following organizations: ALBA (observer), Colombo Plan, UNESCAP, ECO, FAO, GECF, G-15, G-24, G-77, IAEA, IBRD, ICC, ICAO, IDA, International Federation of Red Cross and Red Crescent Societies, IFC, IFAD, IHO, ILO, IMO, IMSO, IMF, IOC, IOM, ISO, International Red Cross and Red Crescent Movement, ITU, Interpol, IDB, NAM, OPEC, OPCW, OIC, PCA, SCO, SAARC (observer), UNESCO, UNCTAD, UNIDO, United Nations, UPU, WCO WFTU, WHO, WMO, WTO (observer).

Notes

See also

 Axis of Resistance
 International rankings of Iran
 Iranian citizens abroad
 Geography of Iran
 Iran–Contra Affair
 Iran–Iraq War
 List of diplomatic missions in Iran
 List of diplomatic missions of Iran
 United Nations Security Council Resolution 1747
 Foreign Direct Investment in Iran
 Middle East economic integration
 Shia crescent
 Hormuz Peace Initiative
 Academic relations between Iran and the United States

References

Further reading
 Dr. Abbas Maleki and Dr. Kaveh L. Afrasiabi, [Reading in Iran's Foreign Policy After 11 September], Booksurge, 2008.
 Dr. Abbas Maleki and Dr. Kaveh L. Afrasiabi, "Iran's Foreign Policy Since 11 September"], Brown's Journal of World Affairs, 2003.
 Dr. Kaveh L. Afrasiabi,[After Khomeini: New Directions in Iran's Foreign Policy], Westview, 1994.
 Dr. Mahjoob Zweiri, Iranian Foreign Policy: Between Ideology and Pragmatism
 Sharashenidze, Tornike: "The Role of Iran in the South Caucasus" in the Caucasus Analytical Digest No. 30

External links

 Ministry of Foreign Affairs
 Translation to 48 languages of First Letter of Iran's Supreme Leader following Paris attacks, 21 January 2015, TEXT and AUDIO

 Resources on International Relations in Iran compiled at University of Illinois Library
 Permanent Mission of Iran to the United Nations in New York
 The EU's relations with Iran
 Foreign and bilateral relations of Iran – American Enterprise Institute
 Foreign relations of Iran - parstimes.com
 Iran’s Foreign and Defense Policies - Congressional Research Service